The Truro Highlands Historic District encompasses an area of North Truro, Massachusetts, within the Cape Cod National Seashore, that has served as a recreational destination for more than 175 years.  The major features of the district, which is centered on Highland Road east of US Route 6, are the Highland Light Station, the Highland House (now a museum), and the Highland Golf Links, one of the oldest golf courses on Cape Cod.

The district was added to the National Register of Historic Places in 2011.

See also
National Register of Historic Places listings in Cape Cod National Seashore
National Register of Historic Places listings in Barnstable County, Massachusetts

References

National Register of Historic Places in Cape Cod National Seashore
Historic districts in Barnstable County, Massachusetts
Truro, Massachusetts
Historic districts on the National Register of Historic Places in Massachusetts